Burton Agnes railway station was a minor railway station serving the village of Burton Agnes on the Yorkshire Coast Line from  to Hull and was opened on 6 October 1846 by the York and North Midland Railway.  It was closed to passengers on 5 January 1970, although the disused platforms, derelict signal box and station buildings all remain, the latter still used as a private house.

Accident 
At 06:42 on 17 September 1947, an army lorry conveying German Prisoners of war (POWs) crashed through the level crossing gates and collided with the 05:55 passenger train from Hull to Bridlington. Two British NCOs and seven POWs were killed, with three more dying later in hospital. The accident was caused by an unauthorised driver losing control on the approach to the station level crossing and possibly the ability to press both the accelerator and brake at the same time on the Bedford three-ton truck used. The report concludes:There can be no criticism of the railway arrangements at the crossing and it is clear that this accident, which might well have had even more serious consequences, if, for instance, the couplings of the train had not held and the derailment of the leading van had been followed by that of the coaches behind it, was due to careless handling of the lorry by an unauthorised and apparently inexperienced driver, Staff Sgt. Wadey.

References

Disused railway stations in the East Riding of Yorkshire
Railway stations in Great Britain opened in 1846
Railway stations in Great Britain closed in 1970
Stations on the Hull to Scarborough line
1846 establishments in England
Former York and North Midland Railway stations
Beeching closures in England
George Townsend Andrews railway stations